Ariana Pearl Guido (born August 9, 1999) is an American actress and comedian. Her career began in 2009, when she started performing stand-up comedy and appeared in a short film called Jimmy's Construction.

Guido has performed several times on stage, including a children's comedy show called "Jokes 4 Kids" at the Jon Lovitz Comedy Club at Universal CityWalk. The show ran for ten weeks in the summer of 2010. The show's creator Vic Dunlop described it as "musical comedy, stand-up, improv, all of which teach kids how to think on their feet."

Guido has appeared in several television shows, including Childrens Hospital, General Hospital, Good Luck Charlie, Shake It Up, Sonny with a Chance and Wizards of Waverly Place.

Guido is of Italian descent. She was born to parents Laurine and Mike Guido, also a comedian.

References

External links

Ariana Guido Stand Up Comedy! at YouTube

1999 births
21st-century American actresses
American child actresses
American people of Italian descent
American stand-up comedians
American television actresses
American women comedians
Living people
21st-century American comedians